The Scorpène-class submarines are a class of diesel-electric attack submarines jointly developed by the French Naval Group (formerly the DCNS) and the Spanish company Navantia. It features diesel propulsion and an additional air-independent propulsion (AIP). It is now marketed as the Scorpène 2000.

Scorpène characteristics
The Scorpène class of submarines has three subtypes: the CM-2000 conventional diesel-electric version, the AM-2000 air-independent propulsion (AIP) derivative, the downsized CA-2000 coastal submarine, and the enlarged S-BR for the Brazilian Navy, without AIP.

The Chilean and Malaysian boats are fitted with the TSM 2233 Mk 2 sonar. The class can also be fitted with a 'S-Cube' sonar suite from Thales.

Air-independent propulsion
The French Module d'Energie Sous-Marine Autonome (MESMA) system is being offered by the French shipyard Naval Group for the Scorpène-class submarines. It is essentially a modified version of their nuclear propulsion system with heat being generated by ethanol and oxygen. This pressure-firing allows exhaust carbon dioxide to be expelled overboard at any depth without an exhaust compressor.

Each MESMA system costs around US$50–60 million. As installed on the Scorpènes, it requires adding a new , 305-tonne hull section to the submarines, and enables a submarine to operate for more than 21 days under water depending on speed.

Naval Group is also developing second-generation hydrogen fuel cell AIP modules for future Scorpène models.

Scorpène information leak

In mid-August 2016, The Australian newspaper published documents containing old technical information about the Scorpène submarines and reported that design details of the Scorpène-class submarine and other ships had been leaked. The leaked information spreads over 22,400 pages and includes detailed information about the submarine's combat and stealth capabilities. The leak also included information about noise levels, submarine frequencies and more. Despite all the information leaks, Indian Navy chief Admiral Sunil Lanba was quoted as saying that the leaks were being viewed "very seriously", but were "not a matter of much worry". The report also suggested that an ex-French Navy officer working as a sub-contractor for Naval Group may have been the source of the leak, and that the leaked data may have been written in France in 2011. However, on 30 August 2016, a court in New South Wales temporarily banned The Australian from releasing any more confidential data on the Indian Scorpène-class submarines.

Naval Group filed a complaint against the newspaper with the Supreme Court of the State of New South Wales in Australia. The Australian court ruled in favour of Naval Group on 29 August and confirmed its decision on 1 September.

Operators

Current operators

Chile 

The Chilean Navy ordered two Scorpène-class boats, which replaced two s retired by the Chilean Navy.

Malaysia 

In 2002, Malaysia ordered two Scorpène-class boats worth €1.04 billion (about RM4.78 billion). Both boats  and  commissioned by Royal Malaysian Navy in 2009.

India 

In 2005, India chose the Scorpène design; purchasing six submarines for US$3 billion (US$500 million per boat). Under a technology transfer agreement, the state-owned Mazagon Docks in Mumbai was to manufacture the submarines, and deliver them between 2012 and 2016, however the project is running six years behind schedule. Construction started on 23 May 2009. In August 2016, over 20,000 confidential pages of the submarine's manual were leaked by Australian media, stirring up a controversy about the impact to India's ambitions of fielding a blue-water navy.

Naval Group answered that those documents were not crucial. After extensive sea trials, Kalvari was commissioned into the Indian Navy on 14 December 2017.

Brazil 

In 2009, Brazil purchased four enlarged Scorpènes for US$ 10 billion with a technology transfer agreement and a second agreement to develop a French/Brazilian nuclear-powered submarine. The Brazilian submarine class was given the designation Riachuelo class. The hull of the first S-BR (S40) was laid down at Cherbourg on 27 May 2010 and is to be jumboized at the Brazilian Navy Shipyard in Sepetiba in late 2012. The latter three submarines will be built there entirely, and are planned to be commissioned in 2020, 2021, and 2022. The nuclear-powered submarine  is under construction since 2018, with scheduled launch for 2027.

The first submarine Riachuelo was launched on 14 December 2018, and began sea trials in September 2019. All the submarines are built by the Brazilian defence company Itaguaí Construções Navais.

Potential operators

Philippines 
In December 2019, Secretary of National Defense of Philippines Delfin Lorenzana announced that the Scorpène-class submarine of France fits the requirements of the Philippine Navy. Lorenzana visited a Scorpène-class submarine when he visited France. On 18 December 2019, Lorenzana said that the Philippines is one step closer to acquiring the French submarine after signing an agreement with France sought to enhance both country's maritime defense. In January 2020, Philippine and French Navy conducted an expert exchange on a submarine to enhance members in the submarine's information about the submarine proper.

Indonesia 
, Indonesia is still considering purchasing a Riachuelo-class submarine, the Scorpène variant constructed for Brazil. Talks for such a purchase started as early as 2016. On 7 June 2021, Indonesia signed a letter of intent to buy six Scorpène-class submarines and weapons packages from France. On 10 February 2022, the Indonesian Minister of Defence Prabowo Subianto and his French counterpart Florence Parly witness the signing of Memorandum of Understanding (MoU) between Kaharuddin Djenod, CEO of PT. PAL and Pierre Eric Pommellet, CEO of Naval Group on cooperation in research and development between PT. PAL and Naval Group regarding the plan to purchase Six Scorpène submarines with AIP (Air-independent Propulsion) along with weapons and spare parts as well as training.

Romania 
, Romania is considering purchasing two Scorpène-class submarines from the French.

Failed bids

Spain 
In 2003, the Spanish government ordered four Scorpène AIP submarines worth €1,756 million. However, the Spanish Navy cancelled the order, and ordered four  submarines, instead. This has caused conflicts and controversies between Naval Group and Navantia, as the latter is still involved in the construction of the submarines sold to India, Malaysia, and Chile, while the S-80 is offered on the export market. The dispute was settled when Navantia gave up export rights on the Scorpène class, leaving Naval Group with sole responsibility for the project.

Poland 
On 1 March 2011, the Naval Shipyard Gdynia of Poland and Naval Group offered a license to build a yet undisclosed number of modified Scorpène-class boats. The Scorpène design is competing with that of the German Type 214 submarine.

Norway 
In December 2016, the Norwegian Ministry of Defence announced that Norway would sign a contract for four new submarines before the end of 2019. These would either be Scorpène vessels from Naval Group or German U-boats from ThyssenKrupp. Norway would also be looking into possible cooperation on maintenance and construction with other potential buyers of the same submarines, such as Poland or the Netherlands. In February 2017, the Norwegian Government announced that it intended to procure its new submarines from the German manufacturer, ThyssenKrupp. Norway and Germany will buy submarines together to mutualize expenses. In practice the tender was cancelled and exclusive government to government negotiations were initiated.

Units

Gallery

Scorpène 1000
See .

See also
 List of submarine classes in service

Submarines of similar comparison
 Type 212 submarine - A class of diesel-electric attack-submarines developed by ThyssenKrupp Marine Systems and exclusively built for the German Navy, the Italian Navy and the Royal Norwegian Navy.
 Type 214 submarine - A class of export-oriented diesel-electric attack-submarines, also developed by ThyssenKrupp Marine Systems and currently operated by the Hellenic Navy, the Portuguese Navy, the Republic of Korea Navy and the Turkish Naval Forces.
 Type 218SG submarine - A class of extensively-customised diesel-electric attack-submarines developed ThyssenKrupp Marine Systems and currently operated by the Republic of Singapore Navy.
  - A class of extensively-customised diesel-electric attack-submarines developed by ThyssenKrupp Marine Systems and currently operated by Israel.
  - A unique class of  diesel-electric attack-submarines developed by ThyssenKrupp Marine Systems and currently being built for Israel.
 S-80 Plus submarine - A class of conventionally-powered attack-submarines, currently being built by Navantia for the Spanish Navy.
 Blekinge-class submarine is a class of submarine developed by Kockums for the Swedish Navy
 KSS-III submarine - A class of diesel-electric attack submarines, built by Daewoo Shipbuilding & Marine Engineering and Hyundai Heavy Industries and operated by the Republic of Korea Navy.
  - A class of diesel-electric attack-submarines, built by Mitsubishi Heavy Industries for the Japan Maritime Self-Defense Force.
  - A class of diesel-electric attack submarines currently being built by Mitsubishi Heavy Industries and Kawasaki Heavy Industries for the Japan Maritime Self-Defense Force
 Type 039A submarine - A class of diesel-electric attack-submarines operated by the People's Liberation Army Navy (China) and being built for the navies of the Royal Thai Navy and the Pakistan Navy.
  - A class of diesel-electric attack-submarines being built for the Russian Navy.

References

External links
 Scorpene SUBTICS in action
 Scorpène Diesel-Electric Patrol Submarine (Navy recognition)
 Naval Technology - Scorpène description
 Global Security - Scorpène

Attack submarines
Submarine classes
Scorpène-class submarines